Douwe Wijbrands (9 October 1884 – 17 November 1970) was a Dutch wrestler. He competed in the men's Greco-Roman light heavyweight at the 1908 Summer Olympics.

References

Further reading
Willems, Hans "Stiekeme worstelaar" in: Leeuwarder Courant dated August 8, 2008

1884 births
1970 deaths
Dutch male sport wrestlers
Olympic wrestlers of the Netherlands
Wrestlers at the 1908 Summer Olympics
Sportspeople from Friesland